38 Counts of Battery is a compilation album by the grindcore band Pig Destroyer, which was released on November 28, 2000 through Relapse Records as part of their Underground series of albums and reissues. The recording collects nearly every release the band issued up to this point in time, including their debut Explosions in Ward 6 album, their splits with Orchid and Isis, and their 1997 demo tape.

Track list

Credits
J. R. Hayes- Vocals
Scott Hull- Guitars
Brian Harvey- Drums

References

Pig Destroyer albums
2000 compilation albums